Project K may refer to:

 Project K (band), a seven-member boy band from Myanmar
 Project K (film), the working title of an upcoming Indian science fiction film

See also
K Project (disambiguation)